Table tennis was part of the 2007 All-Africa Games competition schedule.

Results

Men

Women

Mixed

References 
Sports123

2007 All-Africa Games
Table tennis at the African Games
2007 in table tennis